Mobile Ops: The One Year War, known in Japan as , is a third-person shooter/First-person shooter (different from the PlayStation 3 title Mobile Suit Gundam: Crossfire) for the Xbox 360 that is based on the anime series Gundam. The game features combat in mobile suits, on foot and in vehicles (much like Battlefield series of games.), as well as online play. As the title suggests, the game is set during the One Year War and will feature many of the iconic mecha from that era. Mobile Ops was also planned to be released in North America, but as the game was never released, and there has been no official word from Namco Bandai Games on the subject since the initial announcement, it is assumed that these plans were quietly cancelled.

Mobile Ops: The One Year War is the first game in the series  to receive a "C (ages 15 and up)" rating by the CERO.

Plot
While not much is known about the actual plot of the game, it is clear (hence the title) that the game takes place during the One Year War of the Universal Century timeline and therefore only includes mobile suits of the Mobile Suit Gundam, Mobile Suit Gundam 0080: War in the Pocket, and Mobile Suit Gundam: The 08th MS Team series. 
The game features at least two modes of play: Single Player and Online Multiplayer Mode (however, there is no splitscreen or LAN capability). Recent sources have stated that the game will mainly focus on the Multi-Player mode via Xbox Live. Namco Bandai Games still says that the game features a five-mission single player tutorial for each of the game's factions.

External links
Namco Bandai website  
Dream Execution Technology site
Dimps site
Website with Screenshots and Game information. 

2008 video games
Bandai Namco games
Dimps games
Gundam video games
Japan-exclusive video games
Xbox 360-only games
Xbox 360 games
Multiplayer and single-player video games
Video games developed in Japan